Magna Carta is a progressive rock/folk rock group, originally formed in London in April 1969.  Their first concert was on 10 May 1969, by Chris Simpson (guitar, vocals), Lyell Tranter (guitar, vocals), and Glen Stuart (vocals).

The trio released albums for Mercury Records and Vertigo Records, enjoying particular success with 1970's Seasons.

History
Magna Carta (1969) was released as their debut album by Mercury, before their 1970 album, Seasons, reached number 55 on the UK Albums Chart, although thereafter Tranter returned to Australia. The album was produced by Gus Dudgeon, arranged by later successful producer Tony Visconti, and the session musicians included organist Rick Wakeman, drummer Barry Morgan, jazz double bassist Spike Heatley and others. In 1971, Magna Carta performed at the Royal Albert Hall with the Royal Philharmonic Orchestra. Davey Johnstone joined the line-up, recording Songs From Wasties Orchard (1971) and In Concert (1972) with the band, before leaving to work with Elton John, with whom he is still playing.

Simpson and Stuart were then joined by Stan Gordon, recording and releasing Lord of the Ages (1974). Graham Smith who had played on the sessions for Lord of the Ages, was also added to the line-up but shortly afterwards both he and Gordon left. There followed a period of change as Simpson and Stuart added a new rhythm section. This short-lived set-up soon gave way to the main duo being joined by Tommy Hoy (ex-Natural Acoustic Band), before Stuart left to run a pet shop in Richmond, Surrey.

Nigel Smith joined in time to help record 1975's Putting It Back Together. In 1977, Hoy's former bandmate in the Natural Acoustic Band, Robin Thyne joined the band, along with Lee Abbott. Soon afterwards, Pick Withers was added. Withers stayed only briefly, leaving to join Dire Straits. Amid much acrimony, Thyne and Hoy left in 1979 to form NovaKarta. Tom McConville appeared on the Live In Bergen release, before the line-up changed again to accommodate Al Fenn and George Norris.

Between 1980 and 1982, Doug Morter was added to the line-up, together with a variety of drummers, including Paul Burgess. The 1981 release, Midnight Blue, contained "Highway To Spain". Norris, Burgess, and Morter all left, the latter moving on to the Albion Band. Chris Simpson's solo release, Listen To The Man, came out during this period and featured backing from Abbott, Linda Taylor, and Will Jackson. Between 1984 and 1986, Simpson and Taylor went to the Middle East to run a music club, before returning home to re-form Magna Carta. By 1986, the line-up now included, in addition to Simpson, Taylor, and Abbott; Gwyn Jones, John Carey, Paul Burgess, and Simon Carlton. In 1988, One To One was released on the Tembo label, Jones left the band the same year.

In 1990, Simpson and Taylor married, and, with the semi-retirement of Lee Abbott, they continued to play as Magna Carta as a duo, as well as with a larger line-up for extensive touring.

The 1992 Dutch release, Heartlands, was followed by a tour of the Netherlands. The duo continued to maintain a busy live schedule, and over the years toured over 60 different countries. Several live albums appeared over the course of the decade, in addition to the reissue of the band's 1970s albums on CD.

In 2001, Seasons In The Tide was released on the Gold Circle label, although the label went bankrupt soon afterwards. In 2002, the DVD Ticket To The Moon was released, recorded at the Dutch island of Texel in 2001. Later that year, Magna Carta supported Fairport Convention on their Dutch theatre tour. At De Hanzehof theatre in Zutphen they saw a young violin player from the Netherlands, who had played on some songs with Fairport Convention. Afterwards they met the young man, Matt(hijs) Barnhoorn, and asked him to join them on one of their concerts. In 2002, Barnhoorn became a permanent member of Magna Carta. As well as violin he plays mandolin and guitar. Together they performed two tours of the Netherlands each year since, one spring tour (usually in music cafés, folk clubs, and small venues) and one autumn tour, mainly in theatres throughout the country. They also went on tour in South Africa and played in Canada, Switzerland, Spain, and Belgium.

In 2006, Chris and Linda Simpson announced that their marriage was over.

In 2007, Chris Simpson celebrated his 65th birthday. On 17 August travelled to Liverpool, ostensibly to take part in a radio interview with BBC Radio Merseyside presenter Spencer Leigh. However, it transpired that his wife had secretly arranged for Magna Carta to perform at the Cavern Club on Mathew Street. The Cavern concert turned into a celebration, and the band was joined by Lee Abbott on bass and Iain 'Stewy' Stewart on harmonica. At the end of the concert, Simpson was presented with one of the Cavern bricks with the band's name on it.  This has since been mounted on the Wall of Fame, along with the names of all the acts ever to have played the venue, opposite The Cavern Club itself.

In 2007, Magna Carta had already decided that they would disband in 2009, mainly in recognition of the deterioration of the Simpsons' relationship. In late 2008 they embarked upon a "farewell tour" of the Netherlands. On 11 May 2009, Chris and Linda Simpson, along with Matt Barnhoorn, played their last concert at Koninklijk Theater Carré in Amsterdam. The trio were joined by some ex-members of Magna Carta: Lee Abbott, Doug Morter, George Norris and Tom Hoy. Two Dutch musicians were also present: Mike Roelofs (keyboards) and Eddie C (percussion). Barnhoorn's father, Henny,  played the bagpipes at the start of the second half of the concert. Dr. Andrew Jackson, doctor and part-time actor, was the narrator (as he was on the recording of "Fields of Eden" on the Backroads album).

A tour featuring Simpson and Tom Hoy went ahead in South Africa in September 2009.  Hoy has since stated that he has no intention of taking part in future tours and, as a result, a 2010 tour of South Africa took place with the line up of Chris Simpson and Nick Hall; they also performed in Spain, Canada and the Netherlands in 2011.

In early 2011, Midnight Blue was released in a double album package with the live album Live & Let Live. In September and October 2011, a new Magna Carta line up toured around 17 venues in the Netherlands. George Norris returned on guitar and vocals and the latest addition was Dutch multi-instrumentalist Laurens Joensen [pronounced Jo-ansen]. Joensen played slide guitar, acoustic guitar, banjo, mandolin, violin.

After another tour in the Netherlands, the band returned to the studio to record a new album, The Fields of Eden (2015).

In December 2019 they announced their final concert, after 50 years

Discography

Studio albums
Magna Carta (1969)
 Also issued as This is Magna Carta and Times of Change
Seasons (1970)
Songs from Wasties Orchard (1971)
Lord of the Ages (1973)
Took A Long Time (1976)
 Also issued as Putting it Back Together
Martin's Café (1977)
Prisoners on the Line (1978)
No Truth in the Rumour (1979)
Midnight Blue (1982)
Sweet Deceiver (1983)
One to One (1988)
Reissued with three additional tracks as Rings Around the Moon (2000)
Reissued as Ticket to the Moon (2005)
Seasons (1991)
Lord of the Ages (1991)
Heartlands (1992)
Seasons in the Tide (2001)
In Tomorrow (2CDs and a DVD) (2005)
The Fields of Eden (2015)

Live albums
In Concert (1972)
Live in Bergen (1978)
State of the Art (1993)
Live at the BBC (1995)
Live at Grassington (1999)
Evergreen (2000)
Forever (2000)
A Touch of Class (2002)
Ticket to the Moon (DVD) (2002)

Compilation albums
Spotlight on Magna Carta (1977)
Old Master & New Horizons (1991)
Milestones (2CD) (1994)
Las Tierras del Viento (1995)
Limited Edition (1996)
Seasons + Wasties Orchard (1999)
Lord of the Ages + Martin's Cafe (1999)
Where to Now? (2000)
Magna Carta Gold (2003)
Ages and Seasons (2003). Features 4 complete albums: "Seasons", "Songs From Wasties Orchard", "Lord Of The Ages" and "Martin's Cafe".
In Tomorrow (2005)
Backroads (2006)
Airport Song (DVD) (2006)
Deserted Highways of the Heart... (2007)
Tomorrow Never Comes, The Anthology 1969-2006 (2CD) (2007)
Written in the Wind (2CD) (2008)

Other releases
Chris Simpson - Listen to the Man (1984)
Paul Stewart - That's the Way it Goes (2006)

References

External links
 
 
 

Musical groups established in 1969
Vertigo Records artists
Fontana Records artists
Mercury Records artists